Inger Pors Olsen (born 7 January 1966) is a Danish rower. She competed at the 1988 Summer Olympics and the 1996 Summer Olympics.

References

External links
 

1966 births
Living people
Danish female rowers
Olympic rowers of Denmark
Rowers at the 1988 Summer Olympics
Rowers at the 1996 Summer Olympics
Sportspeople from Odense